Percy Wyndham-O'Brien, 1st Earl of Thomond (c. 1713–1774) was a British Member of Parliament and an Irish peer.

Origins
He was the younger of the two sons of Tory statesman Sir William Wyndham, 3rd Baronet (c.1688–1740) of Orchard Wyndham, Somerset, Secretary at War in 1712, Chancellor of the Exchequer in 1713 and Tory leader in the House of Commons during the reign of King George I (1714–1727) and during the early years of King George II (1727–1760). His mother was Catherine Seymour, daughter of Charles Seymour, 6th Duke of Somerset (1662–1748), KG, and sister of Algernon Seymour, 7th Duke of Somerset (1684–1750), created in 1749 Earl of Egremont and Baron Cockermouth, with special remainder to his nephew Charles Wyndham (1710–1763), Percy's elder brother, who duly became 2nd Earl of Egremont in 1750.

Inheritance
When Percy was 28 years old in 1741, Henry O'Brien, 8th Earl of Thomond died without issue and in his will left all his Irish estates to him as the younger son of his wife's sister. In compliance with the terms of the bequest, Percy took the additional surname name of O'Brien. On 11 December 1756 he was created Earl of Thomond and Baron Ibracken (the second creation).

Career
He was educated at St Mary Hall, Oxford. He was MP for of Taunton, Somerset, from 1745 to 1747 when he was succeeded by his elder brother Sir Charles Wyndham, 4th Baronet (1710–1763), who would succeed as 2nd Earl of Egremont three years later in 1750. He was MP for Minehead, Somerset, 1747–1754 and MP for Cockermouth, Cumberland, 1754–1761, (Cockermouth and nearby Egremont were parts of the ancient Cumberland estate of the Percy Earls of Northumberland, whose heir was Algernon Seymour, 7th Duke of Somerset (1684–1750), whose co-heir (to these estates and to Petworth House) was his elder nephew Charles Wyndham, (Percy's brother). Percy Wyndham was later MP for Winchelsea between 1768 and 1774.

Death and succession
When Percy died unmarried and without issue in 1774 the earldom again became extinct. His estates passed to his nephew George O'Brien Wyndham, 3rd Earl of Egremont (1751–1837) of Petworth House, Sussex and Orchard Wyndham.

Further reading
History of Parliament biography
 Wyndham, the Hon H. A., "A Family History, The Wyndhams of Somerset, Sussex and Wiltshire", 1950.

References

1710s births
1774 deaths
Lord-Lieutenants of Somerset
Members of the Parliament of Great Britain for English constituencies
Treasurers of the Household
Peers of Ireland created by George II
Wyndham-O'Brien, Percy
Wyndham, Percy
Wyndham, Percy
British MPs 1754–1761
British MPs 1761–1768
British MPs 1768–1774
Percy
Earls of Thomond